The 1999 IFMAR 1:10 Electric Off-Road World Championship was the eighth edition of the IFMAR 1:10 Electric Off-Road World Championship . The event is for electrically powered radio-controlled cars which conform to rules set out by IFMAR for the design / construction of the offroad buggies. The event was held indoors in Rauma in Finland. Racing was held indoors at the Umihall Racing Arena which is a multi sports venue built in the early 1980s. The venue has been used for RC events before having previously hosted the 1995 European Championship. There were 19 countries represented and a staggering 45000 laps were completed by the competitors during the event.
.

Results

2WD

Qualifying

Race

4wd

Qualifying

Race

Reference

Works cited 

 -->

IFMAR 1:10 Electric Off-Road World Championship
International sports competitions hosted by Finland